Scalloway ("bay with the large house(s)") is the largest settlement on the west coast of the Mainland, the largest island of the Shetland Islands, Scotland. The village had a population of roughly 900, at the 2011 census.  Now a fishing port, until 1708 it was the capital of the Shetland Islands (now Lerwick, on the east coast of the Shetland Mainland).

It contains one of the two castles built in Shetland; this one was constructed in 1600. Scalloway is the location of the North Atlantic Fisheries College (part of the University of the Highlands and Islands), which offers courses and supports research programmes in fisheries sciences, aquaculture, marine engineering and coastal management. It is also home to the Centre for Nordic Studies.  NAFC Marine Centre at Ness of Westshore offers courses in "nautical studies, marine science and technology, and seafood quality". Nearby are the Scalloway Islands, which derive their name from the village.

The village has a swimming pool and a primary school. Scalloway Junior High School, the secondary department, was closed in July 2011 by the Shetland Islands Council.

History 
Scalloway Castle was built in 1600 by The 2nd Earl of Orkney (Patrick Stewart). It was originally surrounded by water but due to land reclamation, that is no longer the case. The remains of the castle are the most notable feature of the village, located near the quay. (The castle is usually locked, but a key can be borrowed from the nearby Scalloway Hotel or from the adjacent Scalloway Museum.)

Norwegian boatbuilders from Hordaland, around the Bergen areas of Os and Tysnes,  built yoals from about the 16th century. Oselvar, the traditional small wooden boat of Os,  were taken apart and then 'flat packed' for shipping to Scalloway. Instead of sending complicated assembly instructions, they sent boatbuilders to rebuild them. Many of these stayed for years in Shetland, and some married there.

To the Hanseatic merchants from Bremen and Hamburg, Scalloway was known as Schaldewage, and as a good sheltered harbour on the route to Hillswick.

Barbara Tulloch and her daughter Ellen – the last witches to be burned in Shetland – were executed on Gallow Hill, overlooking the village.

During World War II, Scalloway was the home base for, and housed for some time the headquarters of the Shetland Bus, part of the Norwegian resistance against the Germans. It was operated by Norwegian Resistance and British Secret Service who ran small craft to Norway to assist the Norwegians. The Norway House and the Prince Olav Pier / slipway, which formed major parts of the base are still existing. Details of the history of The Shetland Bus are on display at the Scalloway Museum.

In 1996, Kåre Emil Iversen published his wartime memoirs,I Shetland Bus Man. It was reprinted in 2004, with a new introduction and the title Shetland Bus Man. Another Shetland author Willie Smith discusses this period extensively in his 2003 memoir Willie's War and Other Stories as does David Howarth in The Shetland Bus (first published in 1951, later printings up to 1998).

After the war Scalloway served as harbour of the Shetland-Orkney ferry service (MV Orcadia) on the Scalloway–Stromness route. After the opening of the Schiehallion Oil Field off the west coast of Shetland, Scalloway took over some functions as a service base for the oil business.

Transport
The service 4 bus operated by Andrew's of Whiteness runs thirteen times from Lerwick between the times of 07:20 to 22:00 and 07:30 to 23:30 on Fridays and Saturdays. Service 5 also run by Andrew's of Whiteness runs from East Voe (Blydoit) three times a day to the isles of Tronda and Burra and extends with service 4. The service 4 bus runs four times on a Sunday from Lerwick but is operated by J&DS Halcrow between 11:40 and 19:00.

Primary source

References

Other sources
Howarth, David (1950) The Shetland Bus: A WWII Epic of Escape, Survival, and Adventure (Lyons Press)  
 Iversen,  Kaare (2000)  Shetland Bus Man (Pentland Press Ltd) 
Sorvaag,  Trygve (2005)  Shetland Bus: Faces and Places 60 Years on (Shetland Times Ltd) 
Smith, Willie (2003) Willie's War and Other Stories (Shetland Times Ltd) 
Howarth, D The Shetland Bus; Nelson, 1951

External links 

Shetland Bus Memorial at Scalloway
Scalloway Museum

Villages in Mainland, Shetland
Fishing communities in Scotland